Lac d'Aumar is a lake in Hautes-Pyrénées, France. At an elevation of 2192 m, its surface area is 0.25 km².

Lakes of Hautes-Pyrénées